Farid Ahmadi (born 6 February 1988) is an Afghan football player. He plays as a midfielder and has played football with Kandahar Aryan since 2005.

International career
Ahmadi made his international debut on 16 March 2003 in a 2-1 away victory over Kyrgyzstan. He scored in the 76th minute.

National team statistics

References

External links
 

1988 births
Afghan men's footballers
Living people
Association football midfielders
Afghanistan international footballers